Aydınlar is a village in the Adıyaman District, Adıyaman Province, Turkey. Its population is 26 (2021).

The hamlets of Göktepe and Miroğlu are attached to the village.

References

Villages in Adıyaman District

Kurdish settlements in Adıyaman Province